The 2021 SBS Entertainment Awards presented by Seoul Broadcasting System (SBS), took place on December 18, 2021 at SBS Prism Tower in Sangam-dong, Mapo-gu, Seoul. This year's show had metaverse in addition to sets and stages. The award ceremony was hosted by Lee Seung-gi, Jang Do-yeon and Han Hye-jin, and the grand prize was won by the team of My Little Old Boy.

Nominations and winners

Presenters

Performances

See also
 2021 KBS Entertainment Awards
 2021 MBC Entertainment Awards

References

External links 
  

Seoul Broadcasting System original programming
SBS Entertainment Awards
2021 television awards
2021 in South Korea
2021 in South Korean television